

Frances Fowler (June 1864 – June 5, 1943) was an American painter, notable as a student of Ella Sophonisba Hergesheimer.  The daughter of F.C. and Harriett (Reese) Herrick, she studied at Vanderbilt University before marrying Edward Fowler, a Columbia, Tennessee judge in 1895.  After his death in 1908, she returned to Bowling Green to study with Hergesheimer.  She traveled extensively throughout England and Italy to study art.  She died in Bowling Green in 1943.

References

1864 births
1943 deaths
19th-century American painters
20th-century American painters
American women painters
People from Bowling Green, Kentucky
Vanderbilt University alumni
Painters from Kentucky
20th-century American women artists
19th-century American women artists